Mother Mallard's Portable Masterpiece Co. is the debut album of synthesizer ensemble Mother Mallard's Portable Masterpiece Company, independently released in 1973 through Earthquack Recordings.

Track listing

Personnel
David Borden – synthesizer, electric piano, production
Steve Drews – synthesizer
Linda Fisher – synthesizer

References

1973 debut albums